Romain Arneodo and Andrei Vasilevski were the defending champions but chose not to defend their title.

Andrey Golubev and Aleksandr Nedovyesov won the title after defeating Mitchell Krueger and Jackson Withrow 7–5, 6–4 in the final.

Seeds

Draw

References

External links
 Main draw

Orlando Open - Doubles